Line 1 (Italian: linea uno) is an  rapid transit line, part of the Naples Metro in Naples, Italy. , Line 1 connects 18 stations. It is operated by Azienda Napoletana Mobilità SpA (ANM). The line has been renamed Metrò dell'Arte (Metro of Art) reflecting the presence of contemporary art works installed in some of its stations.

The line is in the process of being upgraded and expanded. When the upgrading works are completed, Line 1 will connect 26 stations and form a loop, and bring easier access to the city centre for residents of Chiaiano, Piscinola, and Scampia.

History 
Planning for Line 1 began in 1963, when the Ente Autonomo del Volturno (EAV) proposed a new funicular line to connect Vomero with the Museum. However the Commissione Comunale dei Trasporti  (Municipal Transportation Commission) decided to investigate alternative possibilities to a funicular line. After several years of discussions, in 1966, the EAV proposed the construction of a metro system connecting Piazza Matteotti with Piazza Medaglie d'Oro, with provision for further extension to the Hospital in Colli Aminei.

The following year the council approved the EAV's "white paper" for the project. By 1968, a commission had been undertaken to plan and study possible routes and station locations, and they determined that the subway would be about 4.5 km long and have 12 stations, with an average distance between stations of 375m. On the day the project was due to be approved by the council, the EAV attempted to submit an updated version of the draft asking for concessions for construction and operation but was refused, and the project immediately stalled.

A further year and a half passed with no progress made. By 1971, the Azienda Trasporti Milanesi (Transport Agency of Milan) had become involved, assisting Azienda Napoletana Mobilità (Transportation Agency of Naples) in trying to formulate an alternative draft plan. Submissions made in both 1970 and 1971 for further funding towards construction were both refused. A breakthrough was achieved in 1972, with a funding of 42 million lire approved, on the proviso that the line be extended to connect Naples central railway station.

As a result of the breakthrough, in 1972, Metropolitana di Napoli was formed with 1,2 million lire of operating capital and a new revised proposal for the project was submitted. However, despite the earlier promises that were made, the Italian government decided to block the funds. By 1974, it was decided that the responsibility for funding the project should fall on the regional government, not the Italian government. A new budget of 10 million lire was made available. On Christmas Eve 1974, the new proposals were finally given approval. Between 1975 and 1977, the project was again delayed as an Interministerial Commission was conducted as part of governmental scrutiny processes. In 1976 the municipal council finally granted the money to implement the project and the foundation stone for Medaglie d'Oro station was laid on 22 December 1976.

In 1978, it was decided that the line could be extended to Scampia and Piscinola, and the funding was provided by the European Community. By 1980, the line had reached Piazza Vanvitelli, but on 23 November of that year, the Irpinia earthquake struck nearby Conza, causing extensive damage and loss of life. It was then advised that plans would have to be adapted to deal with possible future earthquakes. The European Union funded 33% of the total expenditure for this additions to the plans. However, in the mid 1990s, it emerged that elements of the Camorra had been involved in syphoning millions of lire of this funding.

In 1983, further funding issues continually blocked and delayed construction work, and in 1984, the council was forced to apply for loans for the continuation of construction. The following year, the contract for the construction of the stretch from Colli Aminei to Piscinola proceeded, with funds allocated by the Comune di Napoli council and Campania regional government, and in May 1985, the stretch between Piazza Medaglie d'Oro and Colli Aminei. 

Between 1986 and 1988, sections of line from Colli Aminei to Vanvitelli, Piscinola and Savator Rosa were completed.

After thirteen years of work, the first section of the line, between the stations of Vanvitelli and Colli Aminei, opened on 23 March 1993. 

On 19 July 1995, the line was extended to Piscinola – Scampia.

A large length of Line 1 runs along the coast of the Bay of Naples, and some is parallel to the ancient city wall. Much of the area through which it has been constructed is archaeologically rich, and many objects have been recovered during its construction. Currently these objects are displayed in Museo station, and it is planned for further such exhibits at Duomo and Municipio. The Duomo station is also expected to include the remains of an ancient Roman temple.

In 2001, the line was extended from Vanvitelli to Museo near the National Archaeological Museum, where it connects with Piazza Cavour on Line 2 by an underground walkway.  The line was extended to Dante in the heart of the city in 2002 with an intermediate station at Materdei opening in 2003. In 2011, the line reached Università with an intermediate station at Toledo opening in September 2013 which won the prize as one of the most impressive and most beautiful European stations. In 2013, the line finally reached Garibaldi beside the central train station with an intermediate station Municipio opening near the city hall in 2015.

Line 1 was operated by Metronapoli from July 2000 to 2013. In November 2013, operations of the Naples Metro was taken over by Azienda Napoletana Mobilità SpA.

Future
Extension work is underway between Garibaldi and Capodichino (Naples International Airport).

Stations

See also
 Naples Metro
 Art Stations of the Naples Metro
 List of Naples metro stations
 List of metro systems

References

External links

 Metro (official site from AMN) 
 Napoli at UrbanRail.net
 Railways and metro station of Naples 

Naples Metro lines
Railway lines opened in 1993
1993 establishments in Italy